Rob Cook may refer to:

Rob Cook (politician) (born 1965), American
Rob Cook (rugby union) (born 1984), English rugby union player

See also
Robert Cook (disambiguation)